Hebeloma bruchetii is a species of mushroom in the family Hymenogastraceae.

bruchetii
Fungi of Europe